Derek Hull FREng, FRS (born 8 August 1931) is a British material scientist, and Henry Bell Wortley Chair of Metallurgy, at the University of Liverpool. He was awarded the A. A. Griffith Medal and Prize in 1985.

He is the son of William Hull and Nellie Hayes. He is the elder brother of paediatrician Sir David Hull.

Works
; Elsevier, 2011,

References

1931 births
Living people
People from Blackburn
British materials scientists
Fellows of the Royal Society
Fellows of the Royal Academy of Engineering
Academics of the University of Liverpool
Goldsmiths' Professors of Materials Science